Osmelia is a genus of flowering plants in the willow family, Salicaceae. Osmelia includes four species of trees native to Sri Lanka and Southeast Asia. Osmelia is closely related to the monotypic Pseudosmelia of Morotai and Halmahera of the Indonesian Maluku Islands and to the monotypic Ophiobotrys from west and west-central tropical Africa.

List of species
Osmelia gardneri Thwaites
Osmelia grandistipulata Slooten
Osmelia maingayi King
Osmelia philippina (Turcz.) Benth.

References

Salicaceae
Salicaceae genera